Northview Township (formerly West Ozark Township) is a township in Webster County, in the U.S. state of Missouri.

West Ozark Township took its name from the Ozark Mountains, while Northview Township takes its name from the unincorporated community of Northview.

References

Townships in Missouri
Townships in Webster County, Missouri